Michael Wayman (born 6 May 1953) is a British former professional tennis player.

Born in Dulwich, England, Wayman played collegiate tennis for the University of Southern California, where he twice earned All-American honors before graduating in 1975.

On the professional tour he registered a best singles ranking of 171 and made the second round of the 1976 Wimbledon Championships. In 1977 he took Australian Open champion Mark Edmondson to five sets in a first round Wimbledon loss and had a win over British Davis Cup player Richard Lewis at a Grand Prix tournament in Brisbane.

Wayman served as head men's tennis coach at Saint Mary's College of California from 1996 to 2015.

ATP Challenger finals

Singles: 1 (0–1)

References

External links
 
 

1953 births
Living people
British male tennis players
English male tennis players
USC Trojans men's tennis players
Saint Mary's Gaels coaches
Tennis people from Greater London
People from Dulwich
College tennis coaches in the United States
English tennis coaches